Sarah & Duck is a British animated children's television series created by Sarah Gomes Harris and Tim O'Sullivan, and produced by Karrot Animation for the British Broadcasting Corporation (BBC). Though designed as a story-driven animation primarily targeted at 4- to 6-year-old children since premiering at the MIPCOM trade show in 2012, the series now has somewhat of an adult following.

Sarah & Duck was first broadcast on the UK channel CBeebies on 18 February 2013. A total of 120 episodes have been commissioned, with 40 each for Series 1, 2, and 3. The 3rd series started in October 2016.

Premise 
The series follows Sarah, a very kind and polite seven-year-old girl with big eyes, rosy cheeks and a green hat, and her best friend Duck, a mallard. The central theme is the relationship between these two characters and the adventures they have together. CBeebies states that the show has two learning themes: 'Friendship and imagination' and 'Problem Solving'.

Episodes

Cast and characters

Main

Others 
 John is Sarah's Japanese friend voiced by Luca Pilkington Massey.
 Flamingo is John's pet voiced by Tim O'Sullivan.
 The Shallots are planted by Sarah & Duck in the first episode. There are three similar-sized and one tiny one. The three repeat the same phrase when spoken to while the tiny one says a variation thereof. They live in Sarah's front garden by the door, and are voiced by Tim O'Sullivan and Tony Clarke.
 Rainbow makes friends with Sarah & Duck after a rain shower. He is very tickly, and voiced by David Carling.
 Moon first meets Sarah & Duck at the Big Shop when he is heading to work at night. He is voiced by Pete Gallagher.
 Venus is a good friend of Moon and normally Sarah only sees her at night.
 Mars, a bruff Sergeant Major type character, joins Moon & Venus from time to time.
 Hat Lady (or Hattie) is Scarf Lady's old sporting rival and runs the local hat museum. Like her arch-nemesis Scarf Lady, she is voiced by Lesley Nicol.
 Umbrella is scared of the rain and voiced by Jamie Oram.
 Bug is a large ladybird that lives in Sarah & Duck's house plant and collects buttons.
 The Cloud Captain is a French engineer who operates the weather system from Sarah's local park, voiced by Derek Griffiths.
 The Ribbon Sisters are Sarah & Duck's quiet next-door neighbours wearing differently-coloured large sunglasses. They like to play with ribbons and are voiced by Kiki Brooks.
 Scooter Boy has a scooter and wears a helmet. He has been seen riding his scooter only once, and walks it everywhere he goes. He is voiced by Dylan Issberner.
 Plate Girl carries a plate with her at most times and is voiced by Yaeli Miller.
 Cake helps bake and is voiced by Andy Nyman.
 Bread Man runs the local bakery, which Sarah and especially Duck like to visit.
 Tortoise is slow and easily scared. His shell has windows so that he can look out. He doesn't speak.
 Leftover Wool sits patiently in Scarf Lady's wool room, and is voiced by Andy Nyman.
 Poetry Pete is first featured on one of Scarf Lady's LPs and is voiced by Simon Callow.

Production 
The series is produced using computer-assisted animation techniques and the Adobe After Effects and CelAction2D packages.

A second series began airing on 11 August 2014.

On 17 June 2015 it was renewed for a third series  which aired starting the 18 October 2016 on CBeebies.

Broadcast 
BBC Worldwide have secured global distribution and merchandising rights for the new show and airs it to BBC Worldwide's network of channels. On 19 August 2013, Sarah & Duck was first broadcast in the U.S. on Sprout. The first series of Sarah & Duck was also broadcast in Japan (NHK), Norway (NRK), Sweden (SVT), Denmark (DR), Finland (YLE), Germany (KiKa), Portugal (RTP), Iceland (RUV), the Netherlands (NPO) and Israel (Hop! Channel). In Canada it is broadcast on the Family Jr. channel. In Australia, it is also broadcast on ABC Kids. On 12 February 2016 Sarah & Duck was made available in the U.S. on Netflix but left Netflix August 12, 2018   without ever airing episodes made in 2017–2018.

DVD Releases

Reception 
A pilot for Sarah & Duck was first aired at the Cartoon Forum 2010 where it was warmly received. The series was an immediate hit in the UK, and the first four episodes were the most popular pre-school programmes of their week on the BBC catch-up TV service, iPlayer.

The first episode 'Lots of Shallots' was part of the official selection for the 2013 Annecy International Animated Film Festival.

In October 2013 Sarah & Duck was nominated for the British Academy Children's Award for Pre-School Animation. The award went to Timmy Time.

In January 2014 Sarah & Duck was nominated in the pre-school category of the British Animation Awards.

In November 2014, with a second nomination, Sarah & Duck won the British Academy Children's Award for Pre-School Animation.

In February 2017, it was tied in the Kidscreen Award for best animated series with Doc McStuffins.

Stage version 
A live stage production called "Sarah and Duck's Big Top Birthday" was performed by Millenium Entertainment International beginning May 2018 and ending in 2019.

References

External links 
 
 Sarah & Duck - The Official Website of Sarah & Duck
 
 Karrot Entertainment
 Sarah & Duck series Launch trailer

2010s British animated television series
2010s British children's television series
2013 British television series debuts
2017 British television series endings
British children's animated television shows
British flash animated television series
British preschool education television series
Animated preschool education television series
2010s preschool education television series
English-language television shows
BBC children's television shows
Animated television series about children
Animated television series about ducks
Television series by BBC Studios
CBeebies